Gopika Poornima is an Indian singer who mostly sings for Telugu, Tamil, and Kannada language films. She became popular with the singing competition Padutha Theeyaga. Her husband Mallikarjun is also a singer and composer in Telugu Film Industry.

Personal life 
Gopika was born in Vizianagaram and brought up in Hyderabad. After her initial training in carnatic classical music from her own Aunt Smt.M Padma, Gopika further trained under renowned Padmabhushan Smt. Sudha Raghunathan, Smt. Lalitha Sivakumar, Smt.Prabhavathi and at present she is under the tutelage of the famous classical exponent Smt.Binni Krishnakumar. Her father was a senior manager in a central government office in Hyderabad. She participated in the first edition of singing reality show Padutha Theeyaga hosted by ETV. She got opportunities as a playback singer in films through this show and it was also at this time gopika poornima participated in musical reality shows in National channels like Star Plus Meri Aawaz Suno and Zee Sa Re Ga Ma Pa. She met her future husband Mallikarjun in the same programme. After this programme, her father took voluntary retirement from his service and shifted to Chennai to train her in classical music and seek opportunities in professional singing. 

Mallikarjun too shifted his base to Chennai to pursue playback singing. Later they fell in love with each other and got married on 10 February 2008 in Simhachalam. They have one Daughter named Samhitha. Currently they are living in Chennai.

Career 
Gopika made her debut as a playback singer in the film Singanna in 1997. The music for this film was composed by Vandemataram Srinivas. He invited Gopika, and Mallikarjun to sing for a song in that film. Incidentally they recorded their first song in the same studio where S. P. Balasubrahmanyam sang for the first time.

Gopika Poornima has sung more than 500 songs in films and 4000 Devotional songs under renowned music composers like M. S. Viswanathan, Ilayaraja, A. R. Rahman, Koti, Vidyasagar, S. A. Rajkumar, Sirpy, Deva, M. M. Keeravani, Mani Sharma, Harris Jayaraj, Devi Sri Prasad, Yuvan Shankar Raja, Chakri, Vandemataram Srinivas, S. S. Thaman, Anup Rubens and many others.

She is one of the core singer in the musical band "Suswana" along with Mallikarjun and Parthu formed in 2016 and performed in countries like India (Visakhapatnam, Chennai, Tirupati, Hospet),United States (Dallas, Texas), Oman (Muscat), Kuwait.

Gopika Poornima regularly sings in "Swarabhishekam" program telecast in ETV on every Sunday .

Concerts 
Gopika Poornima has done more than 200 shows across the world. She also participated in various musical concerts in the countries like United States of America, United Kingdom (England, Ireland, Scotland), (Germany), New Zealand, Australia, Canada, Malaysia, Singapore, Kenya, Japan, Arab World (Kuwait, Dubai, Oman, Saudi Arabia, Qatar) along with famous singers S. P. Balasubrahmanyam, S. P. Sailaja, S. Janaki, Shankar Mahadevan, G. Anand and composers like A. R. Rahman, Mani Sharma, Devi Sri Prasad, S. S. Thaman. She gave classical concert (Annamacharya Kirtan) in front of the former President of India Pratibha Patil and other delegates in the inauguration ceremony of Annadana Bhavan in Tirupati 2011.

Performances 

 World Tour with A. R. Rahman in 2003.
Performed in United States and UK with G. Anand team along with S. Janaki and P. Suseela in 1998.
Performed extensively with S. P. Balasubrahmanyam across the world in his team.
 Music concerts for TANA (Telugu Association of North America) in 2013.
 Music concerts for ATA (American Telugu Association) in 2008 along with music composer Devi Sri Prasad.
 Music concerts for TCAGT (Telugu Cultural Association of Greater Toronto) in 2014 along with music composer S. S. Thaman.
Music concerts for NATA (North America Telugu Association) in 2014.
Performed at TAL (Telugu Association of London) in England 2017.
Performed at MATA (Mana Telugu Association) in (Germany) 2016.

Awards 

She got the Nandi Award for Best Female Playback Singer for the serial Priyanka (ETV)  in the TV Section 2003.
 She got the Maa Music Award for the Best Female Singer for the film Dhamarukam in 2013.
 She was also nominated for the Best Female Playback Singer for the song Lali Lali in the film Dhamarukam Filmfare Awards South in 2013 and for Bommanu Geesthe - Bommarillu in 2007.

Dubbing artist 
She has given voice for the Actresses like Manisha Koirala, Ameesha Patel, Sadha, Shriya Saran in various films.

TV programmes 

 Participated as a Judge in the musical competition "BLACK" along with D. V. Mohan Krishna conducted by ETV.
 Participated as a Judge and Team leader in the musical competition Airtel "SUPER SINGER 9" conducted by Star Maa in 2015.
 Participated as a Judge in the musical competition "STAR OF AP" conducted by Gemini TV.

Discography

Telugu songs (selected)

Tamil songs (selected)

References

External links 
 

Living people
Film musicians from Andhra Pradesh
People from Vizianagaram
Singers from Andhra Pradesh
Indian women playback singers
Kannada playback singers
Telugu playback singers
Tamil playback singers
Women musicians from Andhra Pradesh
21st-century Indian women singers
21st-century Indian singers
1985 births
Indian voice actresses